The 2022 NTN Ultimate Bearing Experience 250  was a NASCAR Pinty's Series race that was held on May 14, 2022. It was contested over 250 laps on the  oval. It was the 1st race of the 2022 NASCAR Pinty's Series season. Treyten Lapcevich collected his first career Pinty's Series victory, passing Raphael Lessard on the final overtime restart.

Report

Entry list 

 (R) denotes rookie driver.
 (i) denotes driver who is ineligible for series driver points.

Practice

Qualifying

Qualifying results

Race 

Laps: 252

Race statistics 

 Lead changes: 5 
 Cautions/Laps: 5 for 36
 Time of race: 1:26:53
 Average speed: 57.951 mph

References 

2022 NASCAR Pinty's Series
NTN Ultimate Bearing Experience 250